A nail bomb is an anti-personnel explosive device containing nails to increase its effectiveness at harming victims. The nails act as shrapnel, leading almost certainly to more injury in inhabited areas than the explosives alone would. A nail bomb is also a type of flechette weapon. Such weapons use bits of shrapnel (steel balls, nail heads, screws, needles, broken razors, darts and other small metal objects) to create a larger radius of destruction. 

Nail bombs are often used by terrorists, including suicide bombers since they cause larger numbers of casualties when detonated in crowded places. Nail bombs can be detected by electromagnetic sensors and standard metal detectors.

Nail-bomb incidents

pre-2000s
 On 6 March 1970, in the Greenwich Village townhouse explosion, three members of the Weather Underground were killed in the accidental explosion of a nail bomb intended to be set off at a non-commissioned officers dance at the Fort Dix, New Jersey Army base.
 Several nail bombings occurred during The Troubles in Northern Ireland, either by Republicans or Loyalists.
 American Mafia figure Philip Testa was killed by a nail bomb in Philadelphia in 1981.
 Mark Hofmann, convicted of murdering two people with a nail bomb in 1985.
 In 1989, football hooligans threw nail bombs at supporters of a rival club in the Netherlands.
 A number of nail-bombings occurred in 1999 when the neo-Nazi David Copeland planted several devices in London targeted against ethnic minorities and LGBT people.

2000s
 On 11 October 2002 in Myyrmäki, Finland, a 19-year-old named Petri Gerdt committed a nail bombing in a local mall. Seven people died including Gerdt, and 159 were injured.
 On 9 June 2004, a nail bomb was detonated in Cologne, Germany, by the Nazi terrorist group National Socialist Underground (Nationalsozialistischer Untergrund) in a popular Turkish shopping quarter called "Little Istanbul", wounding 22 people and damaging several shops and parked cars. According to the magazine Der Spiegel, the Nazi group claimed responsibility for the attack in a DVD found in the ruins of a house in Zwickau (D) that exploded on 4 November 2011.
 On 31 December 2005, an Indonesian marketplace was nail-bombed, and a second undetonated bomb was found nearby.
 On 29 June 2007, a nail bomb that was assumed to be a part of a terror plot was discovered in a car and was consequently defused by police in the West End of London. There was a second car bomb, further down the street that was apparently scheduled to detonate as evacuees and survivors fled down the street, to a nearby tube station. 
 On 21 December 2007, a nail bomb was detonated in Sherpao, Pakistan by a suicide bomber.  Detonation occurred inside a tightly packed mosque, filled with holiday worshippers.  At least 50 people were killed, with over 100 injured.
 In the 22 May 2008 Exeter bombing, a nail bomb explosive was detonated in the toilets of Giraffe café in the Princesshay Shopping Centre in Exeter, Devon. The homemade bomb exploded in the attacker's face as he was trying to arm it in the café toilet. Police then found another nail bomb inside the café after everybody had been evacuated.

2010s
 On 11 April 2011, a nail bomb was detonated in Minsk, Belarus. 15 people were killed and 204 people were injured.
 During the 2011 Syrian uprising, security forces have been reported to have used nail bombs against crowds of protesters.
 On 15 April 2013, pressure cooker bombs filled with bits of metal, nails, and ball bearings were used in the Boston Marathon bombing.
 On 22 March 2016, nail bombs were used by ISIL during the terrorist attacks on Brussels Airport, Zaventem and the metro station in Maelbeek.
 On 24 September 2016, a nail bomb was detonated in Budapest, Hungary. Two policemen were injured in the attack.
 On 22 May 2017, a nail-bomb attack occurred at the Manchester Arena where American singer Ariana Grande was performing. The total number of people killed was 22 and 250 were injured. Among the 22 dead were children, including one who was 8 years old.
 On 17 October 2018, Vladislav Roslyakov killed 20 people using nail bombs and a pump-action shotgun in the Kerch Polytechnic College massacre.

See also 
 Explosive belt
 Improvised explosive device
 Molotov cocktail
 Pipe bomb  
 Ted Kaczynski
 List of Palestinian suicide attacks (mostly perpetrated using nail bombs)

References 

Bombs
Improvised explosive devices
Insurgency weapons
 Urban guerrilla warfare